Mesrop Mashtots (362February 17, 440 AD) was an early Medieval Armenian linguist, composer, theologian, statesman, and hymnologist in the Sasanian Empire. He is venerated as a saint in the Armenian Apostolic Church, the Armenian Catholic Church, the Eastern Orthodox and Roman Catholic churches. He is best known for inventing the Armenian alphabet  AD, which was a fundamental step in strengthening Armenian national identity. He is also considered to be the creator of the Caucasian Albanian and Georgian alphabets by a number of scholars.

Life

He was born in a noble family ("from the house of an azat" according to Anania Shirakatsi) in the settlement of Hatsekats in Taron (identified as the village of Hatsik in the Mush plain), and died in Vagharshapat. He was the son of a man named Vardan. Koryun, his pupil and biographer, tells us that Mashtots (in his work he does not mention the name Mesrop) received a good education and was versed in the Greek and Persian languages. On account of his piety and learning, Mesrop was appointed secretary to King Khosrov IV, in charge of writing royal decrees and edicts in Persian and Greek. 

Leaving the court, he took the holy orders and withdrew to a monastery with a few companions, leading a life of great austerity for several years.

Armenia lost its independence in 387 and was divided between the Byzantine Empire and Persia, which received about four-fifths of its territory. Western Armenia was governed by Byzantine generals, while an Armenian king ruled as Persian vassal over eastern Armenia. The principal events of this period are the invention of the Armenian alphabet, the revision of the liturgy, the creation of an ecclesiastical and national literature, and the revision of hierarchical relations. Three men are prominently associated with this work: Mesrop, Catholicos Isaac (Sahak Part'ev), and King Vramshapuh, who succeeded his brother Khosrov IV in 389. 

In 394, with the blessing of Catholicos Sahak Partev, Mesrop set out on a proselytizing mission. With the support of Prince Shampith, he preached the Gospel in the district of Goghtn near the river Araxes, converting many.

Armenians had no alphabet of their own, and instead used Greek, Persian, and Syriac scripts, none of which was well suited for representing the many complex sounds of their native tongue. The Holy Scriptures and the liturgy were, to a large extent, unintelligible to the faithful and required the intervention of translators and interpreters.

Mesrop was assisted in inventing a national alphabet by Catholicos Sahak and King Vramshapuh. He consulted Daniel, a bishop of Mesopotamia, and Rufinus, a monk of Samosata, on the matter and created an alphabet of thirty-six letters; two more (long O (Օ, օ) and F (Ֆ, ֆ)) were added in the twelfth century.

The first sentence in Armenian written down by St. Mesrop after he invented the letters was the opening line of Solomon's Book of Proverbs:

The invention of the alphabet around 405 was the beginning of Armenian literature and proved a powerful factor in the building of national spirit. "The result of the work of Isaac and Mesrop", says St. Martin, "was to separate for ever the Armenians from the other peoples of the East, to make of them a distinct nation, and to strengthen them in the Christian Faith by forbidding or rendering profane all the foreign alphabetic scripts which were employed for transcribing the books of the heathens and of the followers of Zoroaster. To Mesrop we owe the preservation of the language and literature of Armenia; but for his work, the people would have been absorbed by the Persians and Syrians, and would have disappeared like so many nations of the East".

Medieval Armenian sources also claim that Mashtots invented the Georgian and Caucasian Albanian alphabets around the same time. Most scholars link the creation of the Georgian script to the process of Christianization of Iberia, a core Georgian kingdom of Kartli. The alphabet was therefore most probably created between the conversion of Iberia under King Mirian III (326 or 337) and the Bir el Qutt inscriptions of 430, contemporaneously with the Armenian alphabet.

Encouraged by the patriarch and the king, Mesrop founded numerous schools in different parts of the country, in which the youth were taught the new alphabet. He himself taught at the Amaras monastery of the Armenian province of Artsakh (located in the contemporary Martuni region of the unrecognized Nagorno-Karabakh Republic). However, his activity was not confined to Eastern Armenia. Provided with letters from the Catholicos, he went to Constantinople and obtained from emperor Theodosius the Younger permission to preach and teach in his Armenian possessions. Having returned to Eastern Armenia to report to the patriarch, his first thought was to provide religious literature for his countrymen. He sent some of his numerous disciples to Edessa, Constantinople, Athens, Antioch, Alexandria, and other centers of learning, to study the Greek language and bring back the masterpieces of Greek literature. The most famous of his pupils were John of Egheghiatz, Joseph of Baghin, Yeznik, Koriun, Moses of Chorene, and John Mandakuni.

The first monument of Armenian literature is the version of the Holy Scriptures. Isaac, says Moses of Chorene, made a translation of the Bible from the Syriac text about 411. This work was considered imperfect, for soon afterwards John of Egheghiatz and Joseph of Baghin were sent to Edessa to translate the Scriptures. They journeyed as far as Constantinople and brought back authentic copies of the Greek text with them. With the help of other copies obtained from Alexandria, the Bible was translated again from the Greek according to the text of the Septuagint and Origen's Hexapla. This version, now in use in the Armenian Church, was completed about 434.

The decrees of the first three ecumenical councils — Nicæa, Constantinople, and Ephesus — and the national liturgy (so far written in Syriac) were also translated into Armenian, the latter being revised on the liturgy of St. Basil, though retaining characteristics of its own. Many works of the Greek Fathers were also translated into Armenian. The loss of the Greek originals has given some of those versions a special importance; thus, the second part of Eusebius's Chronicle, of which only a few fragments exist in Greek, has been preserved entirely in Armenian. In the midst of his literary labors, Mesrop revisited the districts he had evangelized in his earlier years, and, after the death of Isaac in 439, looked after the spiritual administration of the patriarchate. He survived his friend and master by only six months. Armenians read his name in the Canon of the Liturgy and celebrate his memory on 19 February.

Saint Mesrop is listed officially in the Roman Martyrology of the Roman Catholic Church; his feast day is February 17.

Legacy

Virtually every town in Armenia has a street named after Mashtots.  In Yerevan, Mashtots Avenue is one of the most important in the city center, which was previously known as Lenin Avenue. There is a statue of him at the Matenadaran, one at the church he was buried at in Oshakan village, and one at the monument to the Armenian alphabet found on the skirts of Mt. Aragats, north of Ohanavan Village.  Stamps have been issued with his image by both the Soviet Union and by post-Soviet Armenia.

The Order of St. Mesrop Mashtots, established in 1993, is awarded for significant achievements in economic development of the Republic of Armenia or for accomplishments in science, culture, education or public service, and for activities promoting those fields.

Music
Mashtots also produced a number of liturgical compositions. Some of the works attributed to him are: «Մեղայ քեզ Տէր» (Meġay k’ez Tēr, “I have sinned against you, Lord”), «Ողորմեա ինձ Աստուած» (Voġormea inj Astuac, “Have mercy on me, God”), «Անկանիմ առաջի քո» (Ankanim aṙaǰi k’o, “I kneel before you”) and «Ողորմեա» (Voġormea, “Miserere”), all of which are hymns of repentance.

Documentary films 
 Mashtots (1988), directed by Levon Mkrtchyan

See also 
 Bible translations

References

Bibliography 
 
 
 
 
 
 

Attribution

External links 

 Catholic Encyclopedia — Mesrop
 Classical Music Archives — Saint Mesrop Mashtots

360 births
440 deaths
4th-century Armenian people
4th-century calligraphers
4th-century Christian saints
4th-century Christian theologians
4th-century translators
4th-century writers
5th-century Armenian people
5th-century calligraphers
5th-century Christian saints
5th-century Christian theologians
5th-century translators
5th-century writers
Armenian monks
Armenian saints
Armenian scholars
Armenian translators
Christians in the Sasanian Empire
Creators of writing systems
People from Muş Province
Armenian people from the Sasanian Empire
Translators of the Bible into Armenian